CVL-22 may refer to the hull numbers of one of the following naval vessels: 

, a light aircraft carrier in service with the United States Navy from 1943 to 1946, after which she was sunk for weapons testing
, a light aircraft carrier in service with the Royal Canadian Navy from 1957 to 1970, after which she was sold for scrap

See also
CV-22 (disambiguation)